Bembidion decorum is a species of ground beetle native to Europe.

References

decorum
Beetles described in 1799
Beetles of Europe